ABP News is an Indian Hindi-language free-to-air television news channel owned by ABP Group. The news channel was launched in 1998 originally as STAR News before being acquired by ABP Group. It won the Best Hindi News Channel award in the 21st edition of the Indian Television Academy Awards in 2022.
The channel has been accused by protestors for being partial and supporting the ideology of the ruling government.

History
ABP News was launched as STAR News on 18 February 1998 by satellite television provider Star India (Disney Star) in partnership with the NDTV media company, with the latter producing the channel's programming. Initially, a bilingual channel broadcasting in both English and Hindi, its programming turned Hindi-only since 2003, when Star's deal with NDTV expired.

In that same year, the Indian government introduced a guideline limiting foreign equity in the national news business to 26%. As Star India was a wholly-owned subsidiary of Hong Kong-based company Satellite Television Asia Region Ltd. (Star TV), it entered into a joint venture with the Ananda Bazar Patrika group (ABP) to form a new company, Media Content and Communications Services Pvt. Ltd. (MCCS), which took control of Star News's operations. ABP held a 74% majority stake while Star India reduced its participation with the remaining 26%.

On 16 April 2012, ABP Group and Star India announced that they would discontinue the brand agreement that allowed MCCS to operate as "Star News". Thus, Star India would quit the news business in order to focus on entertainment. In addition, the company sold its minority stake in MCCS to ABP Group, which in turn renamed the channel to ABP News. The change was also replicated on other regional news channels operated by MCCS such as Bengali-language Star Ananda and Marathi-language Star Majha, which were renamed as ABP Ananda and ABP Majha, respectively. A Punjabi-language channel, ABP Sanjha was granted licence approval in 2014 and launched in that year. A Gujarati-language channel, ABP Asmita, was launched on 1 January 2016.

In November 2016, Avinash Pandey became a chief operating officer (COO) of ABP News.

All of ABP's channels, including ABP News, were gradually revamped throughout the second half of 2020, beginning with the renaming of parent-subsidiary ABP News Network to ABP Network in July 2020. A further rebranding, which affected the channels themselves, took place in the morning of 16 December 2020, with the launch of simpler, more modern logos and a new graphics package developed by Saffron Brand Consultants for all of ABP's channels. Additionally, ABP News acquired new equipment able to record content at 1080p and launched its own HD feed; the channel's SD feed turned into a downscaled, 16:9 widescreen version of the HD feed. Prior to the HD feed launch, ABP News had launched a test HD feed in February of that same year, exclusively on satellite provider Hotstar and on ABP's online platforms, which was basically an upscaled version of the SD channel airing 4:3 content stretched to fill the 16:9 screen. Although ABP Network's regional language channels were also rebranded, they remained airing at 4:3 standard definition.

Satellite interruptions during the show Masterstroke 
In 2018, former host Punya Prasun Bajpai stated that when he criticized the performance of one of prime minister Narendra Modi's projects directed towards poor farmers in his television show Masterstroke, ABP News' satellite broadcasting was disrupted each time the program was aired. Former employees reported that the channel owners had pressured the host, Punya Prasun Bajpai, to quit the company. After his resignation, these technical issues immediately stopped. Another host, Abhisar Sharma, who challenged Modi's public safety strategies on ABP News, was fired that same day. He also said he was under pressure to leave.

See also  
 Media of India
 List of news channels in India

References

External links
 
 

Television stations in Mumbai
24-hour television news channels in India
Foreign television channels broadcasting in the United Kingdom
Television channels and stations established in 1998
Hindi-language television channels in India
ABP Group
Former News Corporation subsidiaries
Mass media in Mumbai
1998 establishments in Uttar Pradesh